The Statue is a 1913 comedy short directed by Allen Curtis. The film features Harry Fisher as the artist with Max Asher, Lee Morris and Doc Vinard. The film is unrelated to :fr:La Statue, a French silent film directed by Alice Guy in 1905.

References

External links

1913 films
1913 comedy films
1913 short films
Films scored by Riz Ortolani
Silent American comedy films
American silent short films
American black-and-white films
American comedy short films
1910s American films